Harouna, also spelled Haruna, is an African Muslim surname and masculine given name. It is derived from the accusative case inflected form of the Arabic name Harun. Notable people with the name include:

Given name
Harouna
Harouna Lago (born 1946), Nigerien boxer
Harouna Pale (born 1957), Burkinabé sprinter
Harouna Doula Gabde (born 1966), Nigerien football manager
Harouna Diarra (born 1978), Malian footballer
Harouna Bamogo (born 1983), Burkinabé footballer
Harouna Garba (born 1986), Nigerien hurdler
Harouna Ilboudo (born 1986), Burkinabé cyclist
Harouna Abou Demba (born 1991), French and Mauritanian footballer

Haruna
Haruna Ishola (1919–1983), Nigerian musician
Haruna Ilerika (1949–2008), Nigerian football player
Haruna Abubakar (1952–2005), Nigerian politician for the People's Democratic Party
Haruna Yakubu (born 1955), Ghanaian physicist and academic administrator
Haruna Iddrisu (born 1970), Ghanaian politician, Member of Parliament for Tamale South, Minister of Trade and Industry
Haruna Doda (born 1975), Nigerian football player in Malta
Haruna Babangida (born 1982), Nigerian football player
Haruna Moshi (born 1987), Tanzanian football player
Haruna Niyonzima (born 1990), Rwandan football player
Haruna Chanongo (born 1991), Tanzanian football player
Haruna Jammeh (born 1991), Gambian footballer in Hungary
Haruna Garba (born 1994), Nigerian football player in Sweden
Haruna Kasolo Kyeyune, Ugandan politician, Member of Parliament for Kyotera County, Rakai District
Haruna Mawa, Ugandan football coach
Haruna Aziz Zeego, Nigerian politician, Senator for Kaduna South

Surname
Harouna
Mohamed Harouna (born 1950), Mauritanian footballer and manager
Idriss Harouna (born 1979), Nigerien footballer
Adamou Harouna, Nigerien soldier who led the 2010 coup

Haruna
IBM Haruna (born 1940s), Nigerian general, Federal Commissioner for Information and Culture
Boni Haruna (born 1957), Nigerian politician, Minister for Youth Development
Lawal Haruna (born 1957), Nigerian general, military governor of Borno State in 1998 and 1999
Mohammed Haruna (born 1988), Ghanaian football player
Lukman Haruna (born 1990), Nigerian football player

References

African masculine given names
Fula surnames
Hausa-language surnames
Surnames of Nigerien origin